Pantelej is an urban municipality of the city of Niš, Serbia.

Pantelej neighbourhood, Niš, a neighbourhood within the municipality
, a rural settlement in Kočani, Macedonia

See also
 Panteley (disambiguation)